The 2017–18 Vijay Hazare Trophy was the 16th season of the Vijay Hazare Trophy, a List A cricket tournament in India. It was contested by the 28 domestic cricket teams of India. Tamil Nadu were the defending champions. In December 2017, the fixtures were brought forward to allow players to practice ahead of the 2018 Indian Premier League.

Following the conclusion of the group stages, Baroda and Karnataka from Group A, Maharashtra and Delhi from Group B, Andhra and Mumbai from Group C, and Hyderabad and Saurashtra from Group D had progressed to the knockout stage of the competition.

On the first day of quarter-final matches, Karnataka beat Hyderabad by 103 runs and Maharashtra beat Mumbai by 7 wickets to advance to the semi-finals. In the other two quarter-finals, Saurashtra beat Baroda by 3 wickets and Andhra beat Delhi by 6 wickets to progress. It was the first time that Andhra had reached the semi-finals of the Vijay Hazare Trophy.

In the first semi-final, Karnataka beat Maharashtra by 9 wickets to advance to the final. In the second semi-final, Saurashtra beat Andhra by 59 runs to progress. In the final, Karnataka beat Saurashtra by 41 runs to win the tournament. Karnataka's Mayank Agarwal scored 723 runs during the tournament and scored 2,141 runs across all formats, the highest total by any batsman in an Indian domestic season.

Teams
The teams were drawn in the following groups:

Group A
 Assam
 Baroda
 Haryana
 Karnataka
 Odisha
 Punjab
 Railways

Group B
 Bengal
 Delhi
 Himachal Pradesh
 Kerala
 Maharashtra
 Tripura
 Uttar Pradesh

Group C
 Andhra
 Goa
 Gujarat
 Madhya Pradesh
 Mumbai
 Rajasthan
 Tamil Nadu

Group D
 Chhattisgarh
 Hyderabad
 Jammu & Kashmir
 Jharkhand
 Saurashtra
 Services
 Vidarbha

Group A

Points table

Group B

Points table

Group C

Points table

Group D

Points table

Knockout stage

Quarter-finals

Semi-finals

Final

References

External links
 Series home at ESPN Cricinfo

Vijay Hazare Trophy
Vijay Hazare Trophy
Vijay Hazare Trophy